The hairy big-eared bat (Micronycteris hirsuta) is a bat species from South and Central America, as well as Trinidad and Tobago in the Caribbean.

References

Bats of Central America
Bats of South America
Bats of Brazil
Bats of the Caribbean
Mammals described in 1869
Taxa named by Wilhelm Peters
Micronycteris